Mohamed Bazoum, is a Nigerien politician who is the current president of the Republic of Niger. He has been in office since 2 April 2021. 

Before becoming President, he served as the President of the Nigerien Party for Democracy and Socialism (PNDS-Tarayya). He also served in as a Minister of Foreign Affairs from 1995 to 1996 and again from 2011 to 2015. He was Minister of State at the Presidency from 2015 to 2016, and was Minister of State for the Interior between 2016 and the summer of 2020, when he resigned to focus on running for the 2020–21 presidential election. Bazoum won the second round of the presidential election with 55.67% of the vote against former president Mahamane Ousmane. Bazoum is a Sunni Muslim and the first Diffa Arab president of Niger.

Political career
Bazoum served as Secretary of State for Cooperation under the Minister of Foreign Affairs and Cooperation in the transitional government of Prime Minister Amadou Cheiffou from 1991 to 1993. He was elected to the National Assembly from the special constituency of Tesker as the PNDS candidate in a special election held on 11 April 1993; this followed the cancellation of the initial election in Tesker, held in February.

After the January 1995 parliamentary election, which was won by an opposition coalition of the National Movement for the Development of Society (MNSD) and the PNDS, Bazoum became Minister of Foreign Affairs and Cooperation in the government of Prime Minister Hama Amadou, named on 25 February 1995. He was initially reappointed to that post after Ibrahim Baré Maïnassara seized power in a military coup on 27 January 1996, but he was replaced in the government named on 5 May 1996. The PNDS opposed Maïnassara, and on 26 July 1996, Bazoum was placed under house arrest along with PNDS President Mahamadou Issoufou, a few weeks after the 1996 presidential election. He and Issoufou were released on the orders of a judge on 12 August 1996.

Bazoum was arrested along with two other major opposition politicians, including MNSD Secretary-General Hama Amadou, in early January 1998, for allegedly participating in a plot to assassinate Maïnassara. He was never charged and was released a week after his arrest.

At the Fourth Ordinary Congress of the PNDS, held on 4–5 September 2004, Bazoum was elected as its Vice-President. Bazoum was again elected to the National Assembly in the December 2004 parliamentary election, and during the parliamentary term that followed he was Third Vice-President of the National Assembly and Vice-President of the PNDS Parliamentary Group.

Bazoum was one of 14 deputies who filed a censure motion against Prime Minister Hama Amadou on 26 May 2007; Amadou's government was defeated in the subsequent no-confidence vote on 31 May, and Bazoum praised the "maturity of the political class of Niger that has just put an end to the mandate of the team which specialised in the predation of public funds."

After urging the people to boycott the August 2009 constitutional referendum, Bazoum was briefly detained and questioned for two hours on 14 July 2009. Bazoum was re-elected as PNDS Vice-President at the party's Fifth Ordinary Congress, held on 18 July 2009. Following the success of the referendum, he characterized it as a "coup d'etat" and said that the October 2009 parliamentary election was an "electoral farce" intended merely to add a "democratic polish".

President Mamadou Tandja was ousted by a military coup on 18 February 2010. Bazoum said on the occasion that "this is exactly what we were afraid of, a military resolution. Tandja could have avoided this." As one of the leading members of the Coordination of Democratic Forces for the Republic (CFDR), an opposition coalition, he said on 23 February that the CFDR wanted Tandja to be put on trial for high treason because he had abrogated the 1999 constitution in his efforts to remain in power. According to Bazoum, such a trial was necessary to deter future leaders from pursuing a similar course. He said that the junta should hold Tandja until "democratic institutions" were in place, and then Tandja should be tried, although he also said that he felt the death penalty would be unnecessary.

After Mahamadou Issoufou won the January–March 2011 presidential election, he stepped down as PNDS President in March 2011, prior to his swearing-in, in accordance with the requirement that the head of state not participate in partisan politics; Bazoum took over as Acting President of the PNDS. Issoufou took office as President of Niger on 7 April 2011, and Bazoum was appointed to the government as Minister of State for Foreign Affairs, Cooperation, African Integration, and Nigeriens Abroad on 21 April 2011.

Bazoum was moved to the post of Minister of State at the Presidency on 25 February 2015. The move was viewed as allowing Bazoum to focus on leading the PNDS in anticipation of Issoufou's bid for re-election in 2016.

He was elected to the National Assembly in the February 2016 parliamentary election. After Issoufou was sworn in for a second term, Bazoum was appointed as Minister of State for the Interior, Public Security, Decentralization, and Customary and Religious Affairs on 11 April 2016. He took office on 13 April, succeeding Hassoumi Massaoudou.

As a high-ranking member of the Nigerien government, Bazoum was named the successor to Issoufou as the presidential candidate for the PNDS in the 2020–21 Nigerien general election. Bazoum's presidential campaign focused on ideas such as resolving demographic problems within Niger by limiting family size and increasing literacy and gender equality through more education for girls. Bazoum has also promised to target the ISIS insurgency in Niger, assisting the neighboring country of Mali in the process, reinforce Nigerien defence and security, and tackle corruption in the country. Bazoum did not win the first round of the election, held on 27 December 2020, obtaining only 39.30% of the vote. However, he won the runoff election in February 2021 with 55.67% of the vote and was sworn in as President on 2 April, his victory being confirmed on 21 March.

In December 2022, Mohamed Bazoum was appointed current president of the West African Economic and Monetary Union (UEMOA), during the 23rd ordinary summit of heads of state and government of the organization in Abidjan.

References

External Links 

1960 births
Living people
Nigerien Muslims
Members of the National Assembly (Niger)
Foreign ministers of Niger
Nigerien Party for Democracy and Socialism politicians
Cheikh Anta Diop University alumni
Nigerien Arabs
People from Diffa Region
Presidents of Niger